Minuscule 1210 is a Greek minuscule manuscript of the New Testament. It does not contain the Pericope Adulterae.

Location
It is located at Saint Catherine's Monastery on Mount Sinai in Egypt, where it is designated Gr. 173.

Date
Gardthausen and Gregory dated 1210 to the eleventh or twelfth century. Welsby dated it to the twelfth century.

Text
Alison Sarah Welsby identified it in John as a member of textual family 1 and a copy of Minuscule 22.

See also
 List of New Testament minuscules

References

 http://etheses.bham.ac.uk/3338/1/Welsby12PhD.pdf
Greek New Testament minuscules